Terry Woodrow Owens (July 5, 1944 – October 27, 2012) was an American football offensive lineman in the American Football League (AFL) and the National Football League (NFL). Owens graduated from Samson High School in 1962 before attending Jacksonville State University. Selected in the 11th round (99th overall) of the 1966 AFL Draft, Owens joined the San Diego Chargers. He played for the Chargers for ten seasons. He died of Chronic traumatic encephalopathy (CTE).

See also
Other American Football League players

References

1944 births
2012 deaths
People from Jasper, Alabama
People from Geneva County, Alabama
Players of American football from Alabama
American football offensive tackles
Jacksonville State Gamecocks football players
San Diego Chargers players
American Football League players